Neoharmsia madagascariensis is a species of legume in the family Fabaceae. It is found only in Madagascar.

References

Sources

Sophoreae
Endemic flora of Madagascar
Vulnerable plants
Taxonomy articles created by Polbot